Homerton College Boat Club (HCBC) is the rowing club for members of Homerton College, University of Cambridge. HCBC colours are navy blue with white trim, and HCBC boats can be identified by white blades with a single navy blue stripe towards the tip of the spoon. 

The Club exists to provide the opportunity for members of Homerton College to row, cox, coach and compete in various rowing events within and outside of Cambridge.  The Club is open to all members of the College, and most members of HCBC have no prior rowing experience before joining. Further, many have rowed for the first time with HCBC and later gone on to row for the University. The competitive focus each year is to maintain and improve the Club's positions in May, and Lent, Bumps. Wider aims are to increase participation in rowing, to allow members to challenge themselves, test their physical and mental limits, to learn how to develop and improve a team, rowing as crew to the maximum of the collective potential, harnessing those gold-dust experiences of synergy, and above all to have fun and build friendships whilst doing so. 

In 2019, HCBC moved into a new boathouse, co-funded by and shared with City of Cambridge Rowing Club, and St Mary's School, Cambridge.

History

1980s and 1990s: Consistently High Quality W1 Crews 
Homerton College Boat Club first competed in the women's Lent and May Bumps in 1978, four years after the women's bumps divisions commenced in the Mays, and two years after women's racing began in the Lents. The highest position attained to date by either HCBC a Women's or Men's crew was achieved by HCBC Women's 1st VIII (W1) reaching second in the Lents Women's First Division in 1986. In the May Bumps, the highest position attained by either a Women's or Men's crew was 5th, achieved by W1 in the Women's First Division in 1985.  Throughout this period of sustained success in the 1980s and 1990s many Homerton College Boat Club women won University colours in rowing for CUWBC, under the guidance of veteran GB coaches Roger Silk and Ron Needs.

2000s and 2010s: The M1 Surge from Division 5 to Division 1 
In the mid-90s, a Men's crew was formed and started working their way through the lower divisions of both Lent and May bumps. In the space of 8 years, the Men's 1st VIII (M1) boat rose over 3 whole divisions to the top of Division 3 in 2002. This included going up an astonishing 21 places between 2000 and 2001, moving from P10 in Division 4 to P6 in Division 3 with a run that included 6 bumps (including one as the sandwich boat), an overbump, a double overbump and a triple overbump. As mentioned below, rising 13 places in a single set of bumps racing in 2001 remains an Oxbridge record.  

After a few years battling around the top of Division 3, the Men's 1st VIII crew raced twice on the final day of May Bumps 2007, first bumping up in the Division 3 race to move to the head of the Division, and again 90 minutes later, this time starting at the bottom of Division 2 (aka rowing as the 'sandwich boat', a gruelling ask at the best of times). Their second race of the day ended by bumping on Plough Reach in front of the most crowded section of the course, finally bursting through into Division 2 and also winning their blades.  

Despite the increased level of competition, now racing against mainly other 1st VIIIs, guided by the long-term planning and expert coaching of Sergej Using (also captain of Cambridge 99's Boat Club, Henley Masters medal-winner and ex-pro basketball player) the Men's 1st VIII progressed smoothly through Division 2 over the following few years, winning blades again in 2008 and 2010, and narrowlyi missing out in 2011 (only going up 3 places). On the final race of the final day May Bumps 2012, again rowing twice in 90 minutes as the sandwich boat and at the end of a gruelling week, HCBC M1 bumped Churchill M1 to win their fourth set of blades in 6 years, and with it breaking through into the May Bumps Men's First Division for the first time in the Club's history.

2010s: A Resurgent W1  

After consistently building the Women's 1st VIII and squad from the end of the 2000s, and a number of hard-fought but unsuccessful battles on the water, W1 results took a significant upswing after the establishment of long term coach Mike Edey and his process-driven approach.  In 2017, HCBC's Women's 1st VIII, rowing in a brand new Janousek boat named 'Edey' in honour of their coach, W1 went up four places, obtaining blades and securing their spot in the Women's Mays First Division, the first time that Homerton Women's 1st VIII had been in that position since 2000.

Record Breakers - Oxbridge Record (2001) and World Record (2017)

Oxbridge Record - Most Places Advanced during one Series of Bumps Races (Mays/Lents/Torpids/Eights)

The Homerton College Boat Club Men's 1st VIII hold the Oxbridge record for the most places advanced during one series of bumps (either Mays, Lents, or Torpids/Eights for Oxford), advancing 13 places in the May Bumps 2001 by bumping LMBC IV on day one, and sandwiching up to division 3 by bumping Corpus II, overbumping Sidney II and triple-overbumping 1st & 3rd III the following two days and bumping Selwyn II on the final day to take blades.

World Record - Longest Continuous Row on a Concept2 Rowing Machine

In May 2017, the Club broke the world record for longest continuous row on a Concept2 rowing machine. Members of the club took shifts rowing on the same machine for 4 days 12 hours and 10 minutes, keeping the flywheel spinning constantly through day and night, and supported by friends and fellow Homertonians in full view in the college's Buttery (bar/cafeteria).

University colours
List of known members of University Boat Clubs:

CUBC
2019: Dave Bell (Blue Boat)
2014: Mike Thorp (Blue Boat)
2013: Henry Fieldman (Blue Boat)
2013: Mike Thorp (Goldie)
2012: Mike Thorp (Blue Boat - won)
2011: Mike Thorp (Blue Boat)
2010: Mike Thorp (Goldie - won)
2002: Andreas MacFarlane (triallist)
1999-2000: Dan McSherry (Goldie)
1998-1999: Dan McSherry (spare)
1996-97: Suzie K. Ellis (cox, Goldie - won)

CUWBC
2020: Morgan Morrison (Lightweight - won)
2018: Stephanie Payne (Lightweight - won)
2015: Daphne Martschenko (NB - first Women's Tideway Boat Race)
2013: Alex Courage (Lightweight)
2011: Anna Beare (Lightweight - won)
2004: Rachael Hanley (Blondie), Catherine Sutherland (Blondie)
2002: Ulrike Münch-Klever (Spare)
2001: Hannah Cadman (Lightweights), Ruth Pidgeon (cox - Trial 8s)
1999: Adrienne Ferguson, Emma Wylie (Lightweight)
1998: Emma Wylie (Lightweight)
1996: J Harkins, Anne Rowland, Emma Wilkinson (Blondie)
1995: Siobhan Cassidy (née McKenna)
1994: Anne Rowland
1993: Rachel Crew, Emma Wright (Blondie)
1992: Jenny Wagstaff, Rachel Crew, Francesca Chalmers (Blondie)
1991: Francesca Chalmers

CULRC
2011: Chris Bellamy (Pres)
2009-10: Chris Bellamy (won)
2005-06: Che Meakins (Granta), Richard Harrington (Spare)
2002-03: Dave Pearce (Spare)
1992: Fiona Pritchard (Cox)

CUCBC Hon. Sec

2005-06: Sam Farmer
2002-03: Devin-Paul O'Brien
1994-95: Pippa Taylor

Senior Club Positions

HCBC President
In May 2004, the position of HCBC President was founded at the Club AGM and written into the Club constitution. The role of President is to oversee the running of HCBC by the executive committee (composed of Captains and other elected and co-opted student officials, ordinarily rotated annually), and along with the Senior Treasurer, a College fellow appointed by Homerton College, to ensure the long-term success of the Club and contribution to College life.

List of HCBC Presidents
2020–present: Jon Rackham and Shruti Cameron
2014–2020: Sam Farmer
2013–2014: Oliver Rubens
2006–2013: Adam Marsh
2004–2006: Ruth Pidgeon
1984–1985: Emma Dalseme

HCBC Senior Treasurer 

The HCBC Senior Treasurer is a member of Homerton College staff appointed to oversee and help the long term running of the Boat Club, and is the direct conduit between the Club and the College.

List of HCBC Senior Treasurers

(Estimated dates, tbc)

2019-present: Dr William Fawcett
1995-2020: Philip Stephenson (now Emeritus Fellow)

Club Kit

HCBC Club kit is based on the colours of the Club, blue with white trim. However (in most years) the colours of the Club Zephyr (garment) are reversed, and are white with blue trim.  

It is traditional to wear a sock of each of the boat club's colours when racing with a blue sock on the foot opposite the rigger.

Fleet (Past and Present)

(Details and dates tbc)

Below is a list of boats that comprise the HCBC fleet, past and present (retired boats are marked with retd.). Alongside each boat is a list of principal crews / dates (where appropriate), as well as any significant or otherwise interesting notes.

Geoff

Crews:

 Women's 1st VI+
 Men's 1st VI+

Notes:

"Geoff", named in honour of former Homerton College Principal, Professor Geoff Ward, was officially launched at a ceremony in December 2021, the same day as the Fairbairn Cup Races earlier that day.  Officially naming the new boat with a spray of champagne, Prof. Ward said "I am touched to have had a new boat named after me. I wish our excellent rowers many years of success and pleasure on the water with ‘Geoff’."

Edey

Crews:

 Women's 1st VIII (2017 - )
 
Notes:

HCBC's first Janousek was named Edey named after longtime coach Mike Edey and launched in 2017.

Stevie Stephenson

Crews:

(tbc)
 Women's 1st VIII
 Men's 2nd VIII

Notes:

The Stevie Stephenson was named after the father of the long-serving HCBC Senior Treasurer, Phil Stephenson, in honour of the many years of dedicated service that Phil had given to the Club.  After a boat naming ceremony in April 2007, with speeches from both Phil Stephenson and then-president Adam Marsh, Stevie Stephenson was given its maiden paddle in a 'Captain's Row', crewed by multiple past Women's and Men's Captains, alongside 2 other boats crewed by both past and present HCBC members.

Hilary (retd.)

Crews:

 Men's 1st VIII (1995-2006)
 Men's 2nd VIII (1998-2010)

Notes:

The Lady Hilary is for many on the men's side of the Club, the quintessential HCBC boat. Purchased second-hand and over 20 years old when finally retired, she was the first boat purchased by the Club for use by the Men's 1st VIII, and was the only boat used HCBC Men's 1st VIII's for over a decade, also as the principal Men's 2nd VIII boat for an even longer period of time.  A burly and far from lightweight shell, Hilary was surprisingly responsive in handling the various twists and turns of The Cam at speed, and was used in countless bumps, rising the best part of 4 whole divisions in the space of 8 years. During this time, Hilary carried HCBC M1 from the bottom of Division 6 when first entering a Men's crew in 1995, to the top of Division 3 in 2002, including rising an astonishing 21 places between 2000 and 2001, moving from P10 in Division 4 to P6 in Division 3 with a run that included 6 bumps (including one as the sandwich boat), an overbump, a double overbump and a triple overbump. As mentioned above, rising 13 places in a single set of bumps racing in 2001 remains, as mentioned above, an Oxbridge record.

References

 CUCBC/ Cambridge University Combined Boat Club
 Homerton College Boat Club

Rowing clubs of the University of Cambridge
Boat
Sports clubs established in 1977
1977 establishments in England
Rowing clubs in Cambridgeshire
Rowing clubs in England
Rowing clubs of the River Cam